Louis Riel (1844–1885) was a Métis rebel leader in Canada.

Louis Riel may also refer to:
Louis Riel Sr. (1817–1864), father of the Métis rebel leader
Louis Riel (comics), a 2003 comics biography by Chester Brown
Louis Riel (opera), a 1967 opera by Harry Somers
Louis Riel (sculpture), a sculpture by Miguel Joyal

See also
École secondaire publique Louis-Riel in Ottawa, Ontario, Canada
Louis Riel School Division, Winnipeg
Louis Riel Trail or Saskatchewan Highway 11

Riel, Louis